Royal & Derngate is a theatre complex in the Cultural Quarter of Northampton, England, consisting of the Royal Theatre and Derngate Theatre. The Royal was built by theatre architect Charles J. Phipps and opened in 1884. Ninety-nine years later in 1983, Derngate, designed by RHWL, was built to the rear of the Royal. Whilst the two theatres were physically linked, they did not combine organisations until a formal merger in 1999; they are run by the Northampton Theatres Trust. The Royal Theatre, established as a producing house, has a capacity of 450 seats and since 1976 has been designated a Grade II listed building; Derngate Theatre seats a maximum of 1,200 and is a multi-purpose space in which the auditorium can be configured for a variety of events including theatre, opera, live music, dance, fashion and sports. The Errol Flynn Filmhouse, an independent cinema built to the side of the complex, opened in 2013.

In 2005, both theatres closed for an 18-month £14.5m redevelopment. The theatres were merged into one complex, a creativity centre was constructed, and the two venues were totally refurbished. The complex reopened as Royal & Derngate in October 2006. From its reopening, Laurie Sansom was artistic director; under his tenure, The Stage hailed Royal & Derngate as The Regional Theatre of the Year (2010) in its inaugural Stage 100 Awards for "its artistic quality and connections it has with local audiences." 

In 2013 James Dacre took over as artistic director. The Royal & Derngate was awarded the UK Theatre Management Award for Best Presentation of Touring Theatre for its Made in Northampton co-produced work in 2015 and the UK Theatre Award for Best Touring Production in 2016. It was shortlisted for the Regional Theatre of the Year Award again in 2016, and also nominated for Theatre of the Year in The Stage 2022 Awards.

In addition to staging and producing entertainment, Royal & Derngate also provide a programme of creative projects in its Underground space. This is the site of its Youth Theatre. It also presented chances for the local community to get involved in performing, writing and finding out more about what goes on behind the scenes.

History

The Royal Theatre was the first building of what now exists as the Royal & Derngate complex. The Royal, then called the Theatre Royal and Opera House, was built for John Franklin by Henry Martin and designed by renowned Victorian theatre architect Charles J. Phipps with mural artist Henry Bird. It opened on 5 May 1884 with a production of William Shakespeare's Twelfth Night. On the theatre's opening, The Stage newspaper reported:

The theatre suffered damage from fire in 1887, and was restored by Charles J. Phipps. He was the original architect and also built the Savoy Theatre in London. The Royal's proscenium stage was widened in 1889. In the theatre's first four decades, productions of George Edwardes's musical comedies, operas, pantomimes, burlesques and melodramas were most popular. In 1927 the theatre became the home to the Northampton Repertory Players, and it has been run since as a producing house. It is supported by a workshop and wardrobe. Since 1976, The Royal has been designated a Grade II listed building.

Actor Errol Flynn made early appearances on the Royal's stage before embarking on his film career. For several months in 1933, he was part of the Northampton Repertory Players at the Royal. 

In January 1977, scenes for the Doctor Who serial The Talons of Weng-Chiang were shot inside the theatre. The serial was set in Victorian London and an authentic atmosphere was wanted for the theatre scenes. According to director David Maloney on the DVD commentary, the theatre was chosen because it had the nearest original fly gallery to London.

Derngate Theatre was added to the rear of the Royal, and was constructed on the former site of Northampton's bus station. Following its conception by Northampton Borough Council, RHWL designed the new theatre with Arup providing acoustic consultancy and engineering services. Building work started in the early 1980s. It opened on 4 April 1983 with an evening performance by singer Jack Jones.

Recent years
In 1999, the Royal Theatre and Derngate became a combined organisation, run by the Northampton Theatres Trust. In 2005, both theatres closed for an 18-month redevelopment. The total cost, £14.5 million, was received from various outlets, including £1.6m from the Heritage Lottery Fund, £2.6m from the East Midlands Development Agency and Northampton Partnership, and almost £1m from partnership funding by the theatres' development team. The redevelopment merged and totally refurbished both venues. A creativity centre was also built. 100 staff were made redundant but all were offered the opportunity of re-employment once the complex reopened. Initially, the refurbishment work was to be completed in annual periods of three-months. When it was learned that both venues needed to have asbestos removed, and rotten flooring had to be replaced in the Royal, project managers and officials decided to shut the entire venue for more than one year.

Most money was spent on making the theatres "more comfortable for the audiences"; new seats and air conditioning were installed, and other building systems upgraded. The 1980s orange décor of Derngate was replaced with lighting techniques allowing changes to the colour of the interior. The Royal was restored to its original Victorian splendour. Other improvements included the creation of a joint foyer with a new main entrance. A creativity centre for education and community work was added, together with an atrium-style performance space, a new rehearsal room, and better changing rooms for actors.

During the 18-month closure, productions were moved elsewhere. The Comedy Club moved to the Roadmender, as did the youth theatre and education work. The classical music season went to Spinney Hill Hall at Northampton School for Girls, while dance moved to The Castle theatre in Wellingborough.

The complex reopened as Royal & Derngate in October 2006. Royal & Derngate is now the main venue for arts and entertainment in Northamptonshire. The Royal auditorium seats 530, Derngate seats 1,200-1,400 people, and the 2013 film theatre seats 90. The venue offers a diverse programme: drama, dance, stand-up comedy, classical music, children's shows, opera, and pantomime. It also hosts the annual February degree conferment ceremonies for the University of Northampton. 

The venue has produced critically acclaimed shows, including Stephen Sondheim's Follies, J.B. Priestley's The Glass Cage, The Prime of Miss Jean Brodie, and Roald Dahl's James and the Giant Peach, as well as collaborating with Frantic Assembly on productions of Frankenstein and Othello. World premieres have included Arthur Miller's The Hook, Aldous Huxley's Brave New World, and a new play about Marvin Gaye, Soul by Roy Williams. For Christmas 2016, Royal & Derngate will be presenting the European premiere of Broadway sensation Peter and the Starcatcher.

On 16 November 2018, Jo Gordon was announced as the new chief executive of Northamptonshire Arts Management Trust and its venues, Royal & Derngate and The Core at Corby Cube.

Performances
Royal & Derngate welcomes over 300,000 audience members each year to see work in both stages and in the Underground space. 20,000 people a year also take part in over 700 creative projects. Over 20,000 people attended a free outdoor spectacular Crackers? by The World Famous at Delapre Park. Some 80,000 people enjoyed Made in Northampton productions (productions made in-house at Royal & Derngate) that toured throughout the UK.

In 2009, to celebrate its 125th anniversary, the theatres' season included a celebration of Britain's most popular living playwright, Alan Ayckbourn, a new show created with the funny company Spymonkey, and a Young America season, featuring two rarely seen plays by Eugene O’Neill and Tennessee Williams about young people in love. Royal & Derngate also toured co-productions of Kneehigh Theatre's Brief Encounter and, with Fiery Angel, The BFG. In addition, Royal & Derngate played host to some of the biggest touring shows in the country, including the UK premiere of English National Ballet's Angelina Ballerina’s Big Audition and Rambert Dance Company, which has returned since the redevelopment.

The following year, the Young America season transferred to the National Theatre in London, winning a TMA Award and being nominated for an Evening Standard Award. In 2010, Royal & Derngate developed a new charity to provide not-for-profit management services for the complex; it also established another charity to operate Corby Cube, a new theatre in Corby.

In 2011, the R & G's production of End of the Rainbow was transferred to the West End and nominated for 4 Olivier Awards. In addition, Royal & Derngate was named the Regional Theatre of the Year in the inaugural Stage 100 awards. In 2015 Royal & Derngate was shortlisted for Regional Theatre of the Year in The Stage Awards, and won the UK Theatre Award for Best Presentation of Touring Theatre. In 2016 the venue won the UK Theatre Award for Best Touring Production.

Made in Northampton productions
Made in Northampton is the name given to productions that have been produced in-house at Royal & Derngate. Since re-opening, Royal & Derngate has worked with various writers, creative teams and companies to produce these shows, receiving considerable critical and commercial praise. .

Other recent highlights have included the premiere of Nicholas Wright's adaptation of Pat Barker's novel Regeneration, in a co-production with Touring Consortium Theatre Company in 2014. It also premiered Mike Poulton’s adaptation of A Tale of Two Cities.

The Made in Northampton 2015 season included world premieres of Arthur Miller's The Hook in a co-production with Liverpool Everyman & Playhouse, and Aldous Huxley's Brave New World in a co-production with Touring Consortium Theatre Company. The programme also included a co-production of King John with Shakespeare’s Globe, and Patrick Hamilton's classic thriller Gaslight.

Highlights of its Made in Northampton 2016 season include major tours of Peter Whelan's The Herbal Bed (Winner of Best Touring Production in the UK Theatre Awards), King Lear starring Michael Pennington, and Spymonkey's The Complete Deaths. It produced the world premiere of Soul, a new play by Roy Williams about American singer Marvin Gaye, and the European Premiere of Peter and the Starcatcher.

Northampton Filmhouse

The Northampton Filmhouse, formerly known as Errol Flynn Filmhouse until September 2018, is a cinema located in the Cultural Quarter of Northampton.The cinema has a capacity of 90 and is attached to the theatre complex. The cinema opened on 20 June 2013, the birthdate of Errol Flynn.

Due to the success of the Filmhouse, a second screen has been added to the site

History
The first film shown was Behind the Candelabra. With the first public screening being Summer in February.

See also
 Michael Napier Brown

References

Bibliography
 Guide to British Theatres 1750-1950, John Earl and Michael Sell pp. 170–71 (Theatres Trust, 2000)

External links
 Royal and Derngate, Northampton
 History of Northampton's Theatres and Cinemas
 Errol Flynn Filmhouse website

Theatres in Northampton
1999 establishments in England
Cinemas in Northamptonshire